Souleymane Guengueng is a Chadian torture victim and human rights activist, who was instrumental in bringing legal action against the former dictator Hissène Habré.He was born in 1952.

In 2006 he and more than 90 others  testified against Habré in a court in Senegal. More than 90 people testified in this court.
He plays himself in the 2007 movie "The Dictator Hunter" by director Klaartje Quirijns. He is president founder of AVCRP.
Souleymane spent three years of his life in prison.

References

External links
'He Bore Up Under Torture. Now He Bears Witness', New York Times, March 31, 2001
Bio notes, 2003 event at London School of Economics

Chadian human rights activists
Chadian activists
Living people
Year of birth missing (living people)